Protein cornichon homolog is a protein that in humans is encoded by the CNIH gene.

References

Further reading

External links